Min Li Marti (born 1 June 1974) is a Swiss sociologist, historian, publisher and politician of the Social Democratic Party of Switzerland (SP).

Political career and mandatory work 
Marti's political career began in the association of students of the University of Zurich (VSUZH). From 2002 to 2015 she represented the  districts 4 and 5 for the SP political party in the Zürich city parliament (Gemeinderat). Working for the Zürich Film Foundation, she advised SP politicians, and from 2000 to 2004, she was party secretary of the SP of the Canton of Zurich, where she was responsible for the cantonal election campaign. From 2008 to 2010, she led the campaigns as central secretary at the Swiss Union of Public Service Personnel, and in 2011, together with Andrea Sprecher, organized the SP's national election campaign. From 2009 to 2015 she chaired the SP Group and the Intergroup Commission (IFC). Min Li Marti is a member of the local SP board of directors. At the 2015 Swiss National Council elections, she was elected for the SP, where she is a member of the Commission for Science, Education and Culture (WBK).

Personal life 
Min Li Marti was born in Bern as the daughter of her refugee Chinese mother and a Swiss father, and grew up in Olten. In 1995 she moved to Zürich, where she completed her studies in sociology, journalism, social and economic history at the University of Zurich in 2000. In 2004 she co-founded the production company "Das Kollektiv für audiovisuelle Werke GmbH". From 2012 to 2015, Marti worked as a Senior Consultant for the Kampagnenforum and a communications agency. As columnist of the free newspaper 20 Minuten, Marti became known to a wider public. Since the end of 2014, she has been the editor-in-chief of the weekly newspaper P.S. based in Zürich. Marti is married to the Swiss politician Balthasar Glättli and lives in Zürich-Wipkingen. According to the two politicians, her daughter, born on 24 January 2018, is the first baby whose parents are members of the National Council at the same time. Until the spring session at the end of February 2018, Marti and Glättli took parental leave; Marti continued her maternity leave by end of spring 2018.

Film production 
Marti also produces three movies, among them two short films and the 2010 documentary Guru: Bhagwan, His Secretary & His Bodyguard as associate producer. She is member of the Das Kollektiv, a film production company based in Zürich.

References

External links 

  
 
 

1974 births
Social Democratic Party of Switzerland politicians
Living people
Members of the National Council (Switzerland)
People from Olten
21st-century Swiss businesswomen
21st-century Swiss businesspeople
Politicians from Zürich
Swiss sociologists
Swiss journalists
Women in publishing
Swiss women sociologists
Swiss women journalists
Swiss women economists
Swiss women historians
Swiss publishers (people)
University of Zurich alumni
21st-century Swiss women politicians
21st-century Swiss politicians
21st-century Swiss journalists
21st-century Swiss women writers
21st-century Swiss historians
Swiss women essayists
21st-century essayists